Une femme coquette  (A Flirtatious Woman) (1955) was the first of four short fiction films made by French filmmaker Jean-Luc Godard preceding his work in feature-length narrative film.

The short film is based on the story Le Signe (The Signal) by Guy de Maupassant. It is a nine-minute story of a woman who  decides to copy the gesture she has seen a prostitute make to passing men. Then a young man, played by Roland Tolmatchoff, responds. In Maupassant's original tale the scene takes place indoors, the woman having signaled from her window, but in Godard's revision the characters meet by a bench on the Ile Rousseau in Geneva.

Cast 
 Maria Lysandre as The Woman
 Roland Tolma as The Man

Film data 
 Runtime: 9 min
 Country: France
 Language: French
 Color: Black and White

See also
 List of avant-garde films of the 1950s
 La boulangère de Monceau (also known as The Bakery Girl of Monceau) (1963) by Éric Rohmer

References

External links

1955 comedy films
1955 films
French black-and-white films
Films based on works by Guy de Maupassant
Films directed by Jean-Luc Godard
1950s French-language films
1955 short films
French comedy short films
1950s French films